The Secret Garden is a novel by Frances Hodgson Burnett first published in book form in 1911, after serialisation in The American Magazine (November 1910 – August 1911). Set in England, it is one of Burnett's most popular novels and seen as a classic of English children's literature. Several stage and film adaptations have been made. The American edition was published by the Frederick A. Stokes Company with illustrations by Maria Louise Kirk (signed as M. L. Kirk) and the British edition by Heinemann with illustrations by Charles Heath Robinson.

Plot summary

At the turn of the 20th century, Mary Lennox is a neglected and unloved 10-year-old girl, born in British India to wealthy British parents who never wanted her and made an effort to ignore her. She is cared for primarily by native servants, who allow her to become spoilt, demanding and self-centred. After a cholera epidemic kills Mary's parents, the few surviving servants flee the house without Mary.

She is discovered by British soldiers who place her in the temporary care of an English clergyman, whose children taunt her by calling her "Mistress Mary, quite contrary". She is soon sent to England to live with her uncle, Archibald Craven, whom her father's sister Lilias married. He lives on the Yorkshire Moors in a large English country house, Misselthwaite Manor. When escorted to Misselthwaite by the housekeeper Mrs Medlock, she discovers Lilias Craven is dead and that Mr Craven is a hunchback.

At first, Mary is as sour and rude as ever. She dislikes her new home, the people living in it and, most of all, the bleak moor on which it sits. Over time, she becomes less temperamental and befriends her maid, Martha Sowerby, who tells Mary about Lilias, who would spend hours in a private walled garden growing roses. Lilias Craven died after an accident in the garden ten years prior, and the devastated Archibald locked the garden and buried the key.

Mary becomes interested in finding the secret garden herself, and her ill manners begin to soften as a result. Soon, she comes to enjoy the company of Martha, the gardener Ben Weatherstaff and a friendly robin redbreast. Her health and attitude improve with the bracing Yorkshire air, and she grows stronger as she explores the estate gardens. Mary wonders about the secret garden and about mysterious cries that echo through the house at night.

As Mary explores the gardens, the robin draws her attention to an area of disturbed soil. Here, Mary finds the key to the locked garden, and eventually she discovers the door to the garden. She asks Martha for garden tools, which Martha sends with Dickon, her 12-year-old brother, who spends most of his time out on the moors. Mary and Dickon take a liking to each other, as Dickon has a kind way with animals and a good nature. Eager to absorb his gardening knowledge, Mary tells him about the secret garden.

One night, Mary hears the cries once more and decides to follow them through the house. She is startled to find a boy of her age named Colin, who lives in a hidden bedroom. She soon discovers that they are cousins, Colin being the son of Archibald Craven, and that he suffers from an unspecified spinal problem which precludes him from walking and causes him to spend all of his time in bed. He, like Mary, has grown spoilt, demanding and self-centred, with servants obeying his every whim in order to prevent the frightening hysterical tantrums Colin occasionally flies into. Mary visits him every day that week, distracting him from his troubles with stories of the moor, Dickon and his animals and the secret garden. Mary finally confides that she has access to the secret garden, and Colin asks to see it. Colin is put into his wheelchair and brought outside into the secret garden. It is the first time he has been outdoors for several years.

While in the garden, the children look up to see Ben Weatherstaff looking over the wall on a ladder. Startled to find the children in the secret garden, he admits that he believed Colin to be "a cripple". Angry at being called "crippled", Colin stands up from his chair and finds that his legs are fine, though weak from long disuse. Colin and Mary soon spend almost every day in the garden, sometimes with Dickon as company. The children and Ben conspire to keep Colin's recovering health a secret from the other staff to surprise his father, who is travelling abroad.

While his son's health improves, Archibald experiences a coinciding increase in spirits, culminating in a dream where his late wife calls to him from inside the garden. When he receives a letter from Mrs Sowerby, he takes the opportunity to finally return home. He walks the outer garden wall in his wife's memory, but hears voices inside. He finds the door unlocked and is shocked to see the garden in full bloom and his son healthy, having just won a race against Mary. The children tell him the entire story, explaining what had happened. Archibald and Colin then walk back to the manor together as the servants watch, stunned.

Themes
In his analysis of the narrative structures of "the traditional novel for girls", Perry Nodelman highlights Mary Lennox as a departure from the narrative pattern of the "spontaneous and ebullient" orphan girl who changes her new home and family for the better, since those qualities appear later on in the narrative. The revival of the family and the home in these novels, according to Nodelman, "is carried to the extreme in The Secret Garden", in which the garden's restoration and the arrival of spring parallel the emergence of human characters from the home, "almost as if they had been hibernating". Joe Sutliff Sanders examines Mary and The Secret Garden within the context of the Victorian and Edwardian cultural debate over affective discipline, which was echoed in contemporary books about orphan girls. He suggests that The Secret Garden was interested in showing the benefits of affective discipline for men and boys, namely Colin who learns from Mary, understood as "the novel's representative of girlhood" and how to wield his "masculine privilege".

The titular garden has been the subject of much scholarly discussion. Phyllis Bixler Koppes writes that The Secret Garden makes use of the fairy tale, the exemplum, and the pastoral literary genres, which lends the novel a deeper "thematic development and symbolic resonance" than Burnett’s earlier children's novels which only used elements from the first two traditions. She describes the garden as "the central georgic trope, the unifying symbol of rebirth in Burnett's novel". Madelon S. Gohlke understands the titular garden as "both the scene of a tragedy, resulting in the near  destruction of a family", as well as the site of its regeneration and restoration.  

Discussing representations of disability within the novel, Alexandra Valint suggests that the most of the novel's depictions of disability coincides with the stereotypical view of people with disabilities as unhappy, helpless, and less independent than people without disabilities. She looks at how disability intersects with gender and social class within the novel through Colin, whose wheelchair would have been understood by Edwardian readers as a marker of both disability and social status.

Elizabeth Lennox Keyser writes that The Secret Garden is ambivalent about gender roles: while Mary restores the garden and saves the family, her role in the story is overshadowed at the conclusion of the novel by the return of Colin and his father, which may be seen as a defense of patriarchal authority. Danielle E. Price notes that the novel deals with "the thorny issues of gender, class, and imperialism". She writes how Mary's development in the novel parallels "the steps of nineteenth-century garden theorists in their plans for the perfect garden", with Mary ultimately turning into "a girl who, like the ideal garden, can provide both beauty and comfort, and who can cultivate her male cousin, the young patriarch-in-training".

In his examination of The Secret Garden within the context of postcolonialism, Jerry Phillips writes that the novel "is not so much a discourse on the end of empire as an embryonic commentary on the possibility of blowback".

Background

At the time Burnett began working on The Secret Garden, she had already established a literary reputation as a writer of children's fiction and social realist adult fiction. She had started writing children's fiction in the 1880s, with her most notable book at the time being her sentimental novel Little Lord Fauntleroy (1886). Little Lord Fauntleroy was a "literary sensation" in both the United States and Europe, and sold hundreds of thousands of copies. Prior to The Secret Garden, she had also written another notable work of children's fiction, A Little Princess (1905), which had begun as a story published in the American children's magazine St. Nicholas Magazine in 1887 and was later adapted as a play in 1902.

Little is known about the literary development and conception of The Secret Garden. Biographers and other scholars have been able to glean the details of Burnett's process and thoughts on her other books through her letters to family members; during the time she was working on The Secret Garden, however, she was living in close proximity to them and thus did not need to send them letters. Burnett started the novel in spring 1909, as she was making plans for the garden at her home in Plandome on Long Island. In an October 1910 letter to William Heinemann, her publisher in England, she described the story, whose working title was Mistress Mary, as "an innocent thriller of a story" that she considered "one of [her] best finds". Biographer Gretchen Holbrook Gerzina offers several explanations as to why there is so little surviving information on the book's development. Firstly, Burnett's health faltered after moving to her home in Plandome, and her social excursions became limited as a result. Secondly, her existing notes about The Secret Garden, along with a portrait of her and some photographs, were donated by her son Vivian after her death to a lower Manhattan public school serving the deaf in remembrance of her visit there years previously, but all the items soon vanished from the archive of the school. Lastly, a few weeks before the novel's publication, her brother-in-law died in a collision with a trolley, an event that likely darkened the novel's publication.

Burnett's story My Robin, however, offers a glimpse of the creation of The Secret Garden. In it, she addresses a reader's question on the literary origins of the robin that appears in The Secret Garden, whom the reader felt "could not have been a mere creature of fantasy". Burnett reminisces on her friendship with the real-life English robin, whom she described as "a person—not a mere bird" and who often kept her company in the rose garden where she would often write, when she lived at Maytham Hall. Recounting the first time she tried to communicate with the bird via "low, soft, little sounds", she writes that she "knew—years later—that this is what Mistress Mary thought when she bent down in the Long Walk and 'tried to make robin sounds'".

Maytham Hall in Kent, England, where Burnett lived for a number of years during her marriage, is often cited as the inspiration for the book's setting. Biographer Ann Thwaite writes that while the rose garden at Mayham Hall may have been "crucial" to the novel's development, Maytham Hall and Misselthwaite Manor are physically very different.  Thwaite suggests that, for the setting of The Secret Garden, Burnett may have been inspired by the moors of Emily Brontë's 1847 novel Wuthering Heights, given that Burnett only went once to Yorkshire, to Fryston Hall. She writes that Burnett may have also taken inspiration from Charlotte Brontë's 1847 novel Jane Eyre, noting parallels between the two narratives: both of them, for example, feature orphans sent to "mysterious mansions", whose master is largely absent. Burnett herself was aware of the similarities, remarking in a letter that Ella Hepworth Dixon had described it as a children's version of Jane Eyre.

Scholar Gretchen V. Rector has examined the author's manuscript of The Secret Garden, which she describes as "the only record of the novel's development". Eighty of the first hundred pages of the manuscript are written in black ink, while the rest and subsequent revisions were made in pencil; the spelling and punctuation tend to follow the American standard. Chapter headings were included prior to the novel's serialization and are not present in the manuscript, with chapters in it delineated by numbers only. The pagination of the manuscript was likely done by a second person: it goes from 1 to 234, only to restart at the nineteenth chapter. From the title page, Rector surmises that the novel's first title was Mary, Mary quite Contrary, later changed to its working title of Mistress Mary. Mary herself is originally nine in the manuscript, only to be aged up a year in a revision, perhaps to highlight the "convergent paths" of Mary, Colin, and the garden itself; however, this revision was not reflected in either the British or the American first editions of the novel, or in later editions. Susan Sowerby is initially introduced to the readers as a deceased character, with her daughter Martha perhaps intended to fill her role in the story; Burnett, however, changed her mind about Susan Sowerby, writing her as a living character a few pages later and crossing out the announcement of her death. Additionally, Dickon in the manuscript was physically disabled and used crutches to move around, perhaps drawing on Burnett's recollections of her first husband, Dr. Swan Burnett, and his physical disability. Burnett later removed references to Dickon's disability.

Publication history
The Secret Garden may be one of the first instances of a story for children first appearing in a magazine with an adult readership, an occasion of which Burnett herself was aware at the time. The Secret Garden was first published in ten issues (November 1910 – August 1911) of The American Magazine, with illustrations by J. Scott Williams. It was first published in book form in August 1911 by the Frederick A. Stokes Company in New York; it was also published that year by William Heinemann in London, illustrated by Charles Robinson. Its copyright expired in the USA in 1986, and in most other parts of the world in 1995, placing the book in the public domain. As a result, several abridged and unabridged editions were published in the late 1980s and early 1990s, such as a full-colour illustrated edition from David R. Godine, Publisher in 1989.

Inga Moore's abridged edition of 2008, illustrated by her, is arranged so that a line of the text also serves as a caption to a picture.

Public reception
Upon its publication in novel format, The Secret Garden garnered largely warm reviews from literary critics, and sold well, with a second printing announced within a month after the novel's release. In general, it was seen as an enjoyable novel, and was reviewed within the context of Burnett's previous works, including Little Lord Fauntleroy. It sold well during the 1911 Christmas season, becoming a bestseller in the fiction category, and placing on critical "best of" lists, including that of the Literary Digest and The New York Times. Its literary debut in a magazine for adults led the public to understand it as adult fiction; the book was marketed accordingly, "with some overlap in the juvenile market", which affected its reception by the public. Of this time, scholar Anne Lundin writes that "The Secret Garden struggled to assert its own identity as a different kind of story that spoke to both the romanticism and modernism of a new century". Burnett regarded The Secret Garden as her favorite novel, although she considered one of her novels for adults, In Connection with the DeWilloughby Claim, to be her Great American Novel.

Tracing the book's revival from almost complete eclipse at the time of Burnett's death in 1924, Lundin notes that the author's obituary notices all remarked on Little Lord Fauntleroy and passed over The Secret Garden in silence. Burnett’s literary reputation waned over the following decades, possibly as a result of biases towards books that garner a female audience. Despite being largely overlooked by literary critics and librarians, The Secret Garden enjoyed a considerable following among its readers. It continued to rank well on readers’ polls for favorite stories. In 1927, it placed in the top fifteen favorite books of female Youth Companion readers, and in the 1960s, the readers of The New York Times ranked The Secret Garden as one of the best children's books. Surveys of adult readers in the 1970s and 1980s show that the novel was a frequent childhood favorite, especially for women.  

Burnett's literary reputation underwent a critical resurgence in the 1950s. Marghanita Laski's Mrs Ewing, Mrs Molesworth and Mrs Hodgson Burnett (1951) described The Secret Garden, A Little Princess, and Little Lord Fauntleroy as the best of Burnett’s children’s books; Laski considered The Secret Garden to be the best of the three, with a capacity to reach thoughtful and self-reflective children. Other British literary critics and historians began to take note of the novel, including Roger Lancelyn Green and John Rowe Townsend.  Thwaite's biography about Burnett, Waiting for the Party (1974), highlighted The Secret Garden for its depiction of unpleasant children that she felt was much closer to contemporary ideas about how children behave. At the time that Thwaite's biography was published, children's literature was becoming a field of greater scholarly interest, and as a result, The Secret Garden began to garner more scholarly analysis. The Secret Garden became accepted as part of the scholarly canon of children's literature in the 1980s.  

In the twentieth-first century, The Secret Garden continues to be well regarded among readers. In 2003 it ranked No. 51 in The Big Read, a survey of the British public by the BBC to identify the "Nation's Best-loved Novel" (not just children's novel). Based on a 2007 online poll, the U.S. National Education Association listed it as one of "Teachers' Top 100 Books for Children". In 2012, it was ranked No. 15 among all-time children's novels in a survey published by School Library Journal, a monthly with a primarily US audience. A Little Princess was ranked number 56 and Little Lord Fauntleroy did not make the Top 100. Jeffrey Masson considers The Secret Garden "one of the greatest books ever written for children". In an oblique compliment, Barbara Sleigh has her title character reading The Secret Garden on the train at the beginning of her children's novel Jessamy and Roald Dahl, in his children's book Matilda, has his title character say that she liked The Secret Garden best of all the children's books in the library.

Adaptations

Film

The motion picture version was made in 1919 by the Famous Players-Lasky Corporation, with 14-year-old Lila Lee as Mary and Paul Willis as Dickon. The film is believed lost.

In 1949, MGM filmed the second adaptation, which starred Margaret O'Brien as Mary, Dean Stockwell as Colin and Brian Roper as Dickon. This version was mainly black-and-white, but with all of the sequences set in the garden filmed in Technicolor. Noel Streatfeild's 1948 novel The Painted Garden was inspired by the making of this film.

American Zoetrope's 1993 production was directed by Agnieszka Holland with a screenplay by Caroline Thompson and starred Kate Maberly as Mary, Heydon Prowse as Colin, Andrew Knott as Dickon, John Lynch as Lord Craven and Dame Maggie Smith as Mrs Medlock. The executive producer was Francis Ford Coppola.

A 2017 production by Dogwood Motion Picture Company is available on the BYUtv Network. This is a science fiction adaptation in the Victorian style based on the novel by Frances Hodgson Burnett; filmed, directed and written for the screen by Owen Smith.

The 2020 film version from Heyday Films and StudioCanal is directed by Marc Munden with a screenplay by Jack Thorne.

Television
Dorothea Brooking adapted the book for BBC television on several occasions; an eight-part serial in 1952, an eight-part serial in 1960 (featuring Colin Spaull as Dickon), and a seven-part serial broadcast in 1975 (also on DVD). The 1952 adaptation was a live broadcast and no telerecordings are thought to have been made. Three episodes of the 1960 serial (1, 4 and 7) are now believed to be lost.

Hallmark Hall of Fame filmed a TV movie adaptation of the novel in 1987, which starred Gennie James as Mary, Barret Oliver as Dickon and Jadrien Steele as Colin. Billie Whitelaw appeared as Mrs Medlock and Derek Jacobi played the role of Archibald Craven, with Alison Doody appearing in flashbacks and visions as Lilias; Colin Firth made a brief appearance as the adult Colin Craven. The story was changed slightly. Colin's father, instead of being Mary's uncle, was now an old friend of Mary's father, allowing Colin and Mary to begin a relationship as adults by the film's end. It was filmed at Highclere Castle, which later became known as the filming location for Downton Abbey. It aired on November 30. In 2001, Hallmark produced a sequel entitled Back to the Secret Garden.

A 1994 animated adaptation as an ABC Weekend Special starred Honor Blackman as Mrs Medlock, Derek Jacobi as Archibald Craven, Glynis Johns as Darjeeling, Victor Spinetti, Anndi McAfee as Mary Lennox, Joe Baker as Ben Weatherstaff, Felix Bell as Dickon Sowerby, Naomi Bell as Martha Sowerby, Richard Stuart as Colin Craven and Frank Welker as Robin. This version was released on video in 1995 by ABC Video under license from Paramount Home Entertainment.

In Japan, NHK produced an anime adaptation of the novel in 1991–1992 entitled Anime Himitsu no Hanazono (アニメ ひみつの花園). Miina Tominaga contributed the voice of Mary, while Mayumi Tanaka voiced Colin. The 39-episode TV series was directed by Tameo Kohanawa and written by Kaoru Umeno. This anime is sometimes mistakenly assumed to be related to the popular dorama series Himitsu no Hanazono. It is unavailable in English language, but has been dubbed into several other languages including: Arabic,
Spanish, Italian, Polish and Tagalog.

Theatre

Stage adaptations of the book include a Theatre for Young Audiences version written in 1991 by Pamela Sterling of Arizona State University. This won an American Alliance for Theater and Education "Distinguished New Play" award and is listed in ASSITEH/USA's International Bibliography of Outstanding Plays for Young Audiences.

Multiple musical adaptations have been made. In 1986, there was The Secret Garden: A New Musical with music by Sharon Burgett and Susan Beckwith-Smith, lyrics by Sharon Burgett, Diana Matterson, Susan Beckwith-Smith, Chandler Warren, Will Holt, and book by Alfred Shaughnessy. Another version was released in 1987 with the book and lyrics by Diana Morgan. Thomas W. Olson wrote a version for the Children's Theatre Company in 1988; the play includes music by Hiram Titus, but is not a musical. However, the most well-known and successful musical adaptation is the 1991 Broadway musical with music by Lucy Simon and book and lyrics by Marsha Norman. The production was nominated for seven Tony Awards, winning Best Book of a Musical and Best Featured Actress in a Musical for Daisy Eagan as Mary, then eleven years old.

In 2013, an opera by the American composer Nolan Gasser, which had been commissioned by the San Francisco Opera, was first performed at the Zellerbach Hall at the University of California, Berkeley.

A stage play by Jessica Swale adapted from the novel was performed at Grosvenor Park Open Air Theatre in Chester in 2014.

In 2020, the Scottish family theatre company Red Bridge Arts produced a retelling of the story set in modern-day Scotland, adapted by Rosalind Sydney.

Radio 
In 1997, Focus On The Family Radio Theatre produced an adaptation in which Joan Plowright narrated as the older Mary Lennox. The cast included Ron Moody as Ben Weatherstaff.

Book forms and sequels 
In 2021, two versions of the story, adapted into graphic novels, were released. The first, released on June 15, was The Secret Garden: A Graphic Novel, with story by Mariah Marsden and illustrations by Hanna Luechtefeld. The second, released on October 19, was a modern retelling by Ivy Noelle Weir, The Secret Garden on 81st Street, following the same vein as the author's previous Meg, Jo, Beth, and Amy. A Japanese-language adaptation of the novel was written by Chihiro Kurihara and illustrated by You Shiina and was released in October 2012 through Tsubasa Bunko.

Citations

References

External links

 
  (plain text and HTML illustrated)
 
 The Secret Garden, available at Internet Archive. New York: F. A. Stokes, 1911 (colour scanned book)
 The Secret Garden From the Collections at the Library of Congress
The Secret Garden as it appeared in The American Magazine via the Hathi Trust

1911 American novels
1911 British novels
1911 children's books
American children's novels
American novels adapted into films
American novels adapted into plays
British children's novels
British novels adapted into films
British novels adapted into plays
Novels by Frances Hodgson Burnett
Novels first published in serial form
American novels adapted into television shows
Works originally published in The American Magazine
Novels about orphans
Novels set in Yorkshire
Heinemann (publisher) books
Articles containing video clips
ABC Weekend Special
British novels adapted into television shows
Novels adapted into operas
Frederick A. Stokes Company books